The 2023 Chicago aldermanic election will take place in two rounds on February 28 and April 4, 2023, to elect 50 alderpersons to the Chicago City Council. Each alderperson represents one of Chicago's 50 wards. The elections are non-partisan and use a two-round system where the top two finishers compete in a second-round run-off if no candidate receives more than 50% of the vote in the first round. The elections are part of the 2023 Chicago elections, which include elections for Mayor, City Clerk, City Treasurer.

The membership of City Council will feature at least 16 new members compared to the winners of the previous election. Twelve alderpersons are not running for re-election. Four additional members resigned during their term and have been replaced prior to the election. Media commentators and analysts have noted this unusually high number of retirements, comparing it to the broader "Great Resignation" phenomenon in the United States workforce.

In the first round election, candidates in 36 wards won outright majorities while elections in 14 wards will proceed to the run-off election. One incumbent lost in the first round and five others will face challengers in the run-off.

Background

Redistricting 
In 2021, the City Council began debate over new ward map boundaries as part of the redistricting process following the 2020 United States census. The proposed map needed be approved by 41 aldermen before May 19, 2022, otherwise proposed maps would have been submitted to voters as a referendum in the June 2022 election.

Members of the City Council fractured in support for two competing maps: one proposed by the Rules Committee and supported by the Black Caucus and one called the "Coalition Map" supported by the Latino Caucus. The former map proposed 16 majority-Black wards and 14 majority-Latino wards while the latter map proposed 16 majority-Black wards and 15 majority-Latino wards. Later versions of both maps proposed the first ever majority-Asian American ward. A resident group called Chicago Advisory Redistricting Commission  also proposed its own map, but it did not receive support from any member of the council. After months of debate, Rules Committee chair Michelle Harris announced on May 9, 2022, that a tentative deal had been reached with the support of 41 aldermen that would create 16 Black-majority wards, 14 Latino-majority wards, and one Asian American-majority ward. The map was approved in a 43–7 vote on May 16, 2022.

Overview

Retiring incumbents 

Alderman Ray Lopez (15th ward) initially launched a campaign for mayor in May 2022, but dropped out and opted to run for re-election to City Council in November.

Incumbents replaced since previous election

Campaign calendar 
Candidates are required to submit a petition with 473 signatures from registered voters in their ward in order to appear on the ballot. Petitions can be circulated starting on August 30, 2022, and must be filed by November 28, 2022.

Ward index

Wards 1-25

Ward 1

Candidates

Endorsements

Results

Ward 2

Candidates 
Incumbent alderperson Brian K. Hopkins is running uncontested.

Endorsements

Results

Ward 3

Candidates 
Incumbent alderperson Pat Dowell is running uncontested. Three candidates (Don Davis, Alan Sargon "Al" Rasho, and Jasmine Roberson) filed petitions but were removed from the ballot due to insufficient valid signatures.

Endorsements

Results

Ward 4

Candidates 

The following candidate filed petitions but was removed from the ballot due to insufficient valid signatures:

 Paul Pearson

Endorsements

Results

Ward 5

Candidates 

The following candidate filed petitions but was removed from the ballot due to insufficient valid signatures:

 Adrienne Irmer

Endorsements

Results

Ward 6

Candidates 

The following candidates filed petitions but were removed from the ballot due to insufficient valid signatures:
 Curtiss S. Llong Bey
 Steven Dejoie

Endorsements

Results

Ward 7

Candidates 
Incumbent alderperson Gregory Mitchell is running uncontested. Two challengers (Anthony "Tony" Blair and Jocilyn Floyd) filed petitions to run for the seat, but were removed from the ballot after due to insufficient petition signatures.

Endorsements

Results

Ward 8

Candidates 

The following candidate was removed from the ballot due to insufficient petition signatures:

 Geno Young

Endorsements

Results

Ward 9

Candidates 

The following candidate filed petitions to appear on the ballot but withdrew prior to ballot certification:
 Sonya Thompson Dorsey

Endorsements

Results

Ward 10

Candidates

Endorsements

Results

Ward 11

Candidates

Endorsements

Results

Ward 12

Candidates 

The following candidate filed petitions but was removed from the ballot due to filing an economic statement, not with Cook County:
Joseph E. Mercado

Endorsements

Results

Ward 13

Candidates

Endorsements

Results

Ward 14

Candidates

Endorsements

Results

Ward 15

Candidates

Endorsements

Results

Ward 16

Candidates 

The following candidate filed petitions but was removed from the ballot due to insufficient signatures:
 Otis Woods

Endorsements

Results

Ward 17 
Incumbent alderperson David H. Moore is running uncontested.

Endorsements

Results

Ward 18

Candidates

Endorsements

Results

Ward 19

Candidates

Endorsements

Results

Ward 20

Candidates

Endorsements

Results

Ward 21

Candidates 

The following candidates filed petitions but were removed from the ballot due to insufficient signatures:

 Justin Sawyer Write in candidate 
 Lawaco Toe
 Patricia L. Tillman
 Bernard "BK" Kelly

The following candidates filed petitions but withdrew before ballot certification:
 Tawana J. Robinson
 Nekoiya Washington
 Aziza T. Butler

Endorsements

Results

Ward 22

Candidates

Results

Ward 23

Candidates

Endorsements

Results

Ward 24

Candidates

Endorsements

Results

Ward 25

Candidates 

The following candidate was certified to appear on the ballot, but dropped out of the race and endorsed Flores:

 Daniel Montes, firefighter and paramedic

Endorsements

Results

Wards 26-50

Ward 26

Candidates 

The following candidates filed petitions but were removed from the ballot due to insufficient signatures:
 Kirk J. Ortiz
 Anthony N. Rivera
The incumbent alderperson, Roberto Maldonado, initially filed petitions to run, but withdrew before ballot certification.

Endorsements

Results

Ward 27 
Incumbent alderperson Walter Burnett Jr. is running for re-election uncontested.

Results

Ward 28

Candidates 

Challenger Shawn Walker was initially removed from the ballot by the Board of Elections, but reinstated onto the ballot by the Illinois Appellate Court after an appeal. Two other candidates filed nominating petitions, but one (Beverly Miles) was removed from the ballot due to insufficient signatures and another (Timothy Gladney) withdrew before ballot certification.

Results

Ward 29

Candidates 

The following candidate filed petitions but withdrew before ballot certification:
 Walter T. Adamczyk

Endorsements

Results

Ward 30

Candidates

The following candidate filed petitions but was removed from the ballot due to insufficient signatures:
Andrew A. Cleaver
The following candidate filed petitions but withdrew before ballot certification:
Rory McHale

Endorsements

Results

Ward 31

Candidates 

The following candidate filed petitions but withdrew before ballot certification:
 Patrick J. Gibbons II

Results

Ward 32

Candidates 
Incumbent alderman Scott Waguespack is running uncontested for re-election.

Results

Ward 33

Candidates

Endorsements

Results

Ward 34

Candidates

Endorsements

Results

Ward 35

Candidates 
Incumbent alderperson Carlos Ramirez-Rosa is running uncontested for re-election. Challenger Richard Mpistolarides filed petitions, but was removed from the ballot for allegedly circulating petitions with a false address.

Endorsements

Results

Ward 36

Candidates

Endorsements

Results

Ward 37

Candidates

Endorsements

Results

Ward 38

Candidates 

The following candidate filed petitions but withdrew before ballot certification:
 Gregory T. Schorsch

Results

Ward 39

Candidates

Endorsements

Results

Ward 40

Candidates 

The following candidate filed petitions but was removed from the ballot:
 Eddien Enrique Gonzalez

Results

Ward 41

Candidates

Results

Ward 42

Candidates 
Incumbent alderperson Brendan Reilly is running uncontested for re-election. Challenger Chris Cleary filed nominating petitions, but withdrew before ballot certification.

Results

Ward 43

Candidates

Results

Ward 44

Candidates 
Bennett Lawson, chief of staff to incumbent Tom Tunney and former legislative aide, is running uncontested. Challenger Nathan Bean filed nominating petitions, but was removed from the ballot for improperly filing paperwork. Bean has filed a lawsuit to challenge the Board of Election's ruling.

Endorsements

Results

Ward 45

Candidates

Endorsements

Results

Ward 46

Candidates

Endorsements

Results

Ward 47 
Incumbent alderperson Matt Martin is running uncontested for re-election.

Endorsements

Results

Ward 48

Candidates 

The following candidates launched campaigns but withdrew before filing nominating petitions:
Seva Gandhi (dropped out in September 2022)
Dennis Sneyers (dropped out in November 2022)
Endorsements

Results

Ward 49

Candidates 

The following candidate was removed from the ballot due to insufficient petition signatures:

 Williamton "Willie" Davis

Endorsements

Results

Ward 50

Candidates

Endorsements

Results

External links 

 Voter Information Lookup (Chicago Board of Elections, updated for 2023 remap, includes new ward and precinct)

References 

Chicago adlermanic
Chicago City Council elections